Shannon's law may refer to:
 Shannon's source coding theorem, which establishes the theoretical limits to lossless data compression
 Shannon–Hartley theorem, which establishes the theoretical maximum rate at which data can be reliably transmitted over a noisy channel
 Shannon's law (Arizona), a law against the firing of gunshots into the air, established after 14-year-old Shannon Smith was killed by a stray bullet in 1999